Emanuel ("Manus") Boekman (15 August 1889 – 15 May 1940) was a Dutch social democratic politician, statistician, demographer and typographer. He is remembered for his activities as a municipal executive board member for education and culture (wethouder) in Amsterdam (1931-1933, 1935-1940) and his advocacy for an active state cultural policy.

Life

Boekman was born into a Jewish bookseller dynasty and was the eldest son of Maurits Boekman (1869-1942), initially a diamond cutter, and Heintje Peereboom. At the age of twelve, he started working as a typographer. He was interested in politics and became a chairman of his trade union, the Typografen Jongelingen Vereeniging (Young Typographer's Society). Originally he was a follower of the early Dutch socialist Ferdinand Domela Nieuwenhuis. Boekman's spare time was devoted to studying, and he qualified for various teacher's degrees, including the economy.

In 1911 Boekman obtained a position as head of the administration of the Amsterdam Harbour Authority and, in 1916, became head of the department for statistics of the Rijksverzekeringsbank (nl), a state insurance bank. In this period, he became a prolific author on various subjects, ranging from statistics and economy to unemployment and alcoholism. From 1921 up to his death in 1940, Boekman was a member of the Amsterdam city council for the Dutch Social Democratic Workers' Party (SDAP). In 1931 he became a municipal executive board member (wethouder) for Amsterdam's education and culture.

On 6 June 1939, Boekman obtained his Ph.D. degree from the University of Amsterdam with professor H.N. ter Veen. His thesis "Overheid en kunst in Nederland" (Government and art in the Netherlands) investigated the 19th and 20th-century history of Dutch cultural policy and projected seminal plans for cultural dissemination by the state and municipalities, e.g., by incorporating art in new building projects and giving the working class access to art. This thesis was influential and reprinted into the 1970s. When the German army invaded the Netherlands in May 1940, Boekman initially stood by his principle that executives should not flee. Later on, when he had changed his mind, the escape route via IJmuiden to the United Kingdom became intractable. On capitulation day 15 May 1940, Boekman and his wife committed suicide together with their friends, the family of the social democrat professor Bob van Gelderen.

In 1963 the Boekmanstichting (nl) was founded, named after him by the Federatie van Kunstenaarsverenigingen (federation of artist's societies). The Boekmanstichting is an independent center for the study of art, culture and policy.

See also
List of Dutch politicians

References
E. Boekman, 1889 - 1940 at the University of Amsterdam Album Academicum website

Sources 
 Boekman, Emanuel: Overheid en kunst in Nederland, Thesis University of Amsterdam, 1939
 G.W.B. Borrie, 'Boekman, Emanuel (1889-1940)', in Biografisch Woordenboek van Nederland.
 Van Dulken, Hans en Jansen, Tony (red.): Het leven als leerschool. Portret van Emanuel Boekman, Amsterdam, 1989
 Jansen, Tony, Boekman, Emanuel, Biografisch woordenboek van het socialisme en de arbeidersbeweging in Nederland, op socialhistory.org maintained by the International Institute of Social History
 Jansen, Tony en Rogier, Jan: Kunstbeleid in Amsterdam, 1920-1940: Dr. E. Boekman en de socialistische gemeentepolitiek, Nijmegen, SUN, 1983.
 Maas, Harro: A pragmatic intellectual. Dutch Fabians, Boekman and cultural policy in the Netherlands, 1890-1940, International Journal of Cultural Policy 12(2006)2, 151-170
 , C. e.a.: Van Boekman tot Schimmelpennink. De kleine geschiedenis van een boekhandel op de Weteringschans, 2003

1889 births
1940 deaths
1940 suicides
Dutch typographers and type designers
Dutch Jews
Municipal councillors of Amsterdam
Social Democratic Workers' Party (Netherlands) politicians
University of Amsterdam alumni
Dutch politicians who committed suicide
Suicides in the Netherlands
Joint suicides
Dutch Jews who died in the Holocaust
Suicides by Jews during the Holocaust